Ronald Henderson was St. Louis' 31st Chief of Police. He was an officer for 29 years and Chief  for 6½ years in the Metropolitan Police Department, City of St. Louis, becoming the second African-American Police Chief of St. Louis.

He was previously St Louis' Police Commissioner from 1995 to 2001.

References

Living people
1949 births
Commissioners of the St. Louis Metropolitan Police Department